The Indianapolis AlleyCats or Indy AlleyCats are a semi-professional ultimate team that competes in the Central Division of the American Ultimate Disc League. In their first year, the AlleyCats competed in the league championship, losing to the Philadelphia Spinners.

The AlleyCats play at Westfield's Grand Park Sports Campus indoor facility. The team has called Grand Park home since midway through the 2018 season. Prior to Grand Park, the AlleyCats played home games at Roncalli Stadium during the 2012–2018 seasons except the 2013 & 2014 campaigns, when they were based out of Kuntz Stadium.

External links

AUDL entry

Ultimate (sport) teams
Sports teams in Indianapolis
2012 establishments in Indiana
Ultimate teams established in 2012